The 1906 North Carolina Tar Heels football team represented the University of North Carolina in the 1906 college football season. The team captain of the 1906 season was Foy Roberson.

Schedule

References

North Carolina
North Carolina Tar Heels football seasons
North Carolina Tar Heels football